Edgar Efraín Fuentes, better known as Gary (Amboy (Córdoba) 15 February 1962 – 9 November 2001) was an Argentine singer of cuarteto songs. His records, first as one of the singers with Tru-la-lá band and then as solo artist with his own band, sold 2 million copies during the 10 most active years of his career.

Discography
 Lo que fui y lo que soy, 2000 - 2CD greatest hits

References

1962 births
2001 deaths
20th-century Argentine male singers